Érd NK is a Hungarian women's handball club from Érd, that play in the Nemzeti Bajnokság I (NBI) after gained promotion in 2010.

In the 2011–12 season ÉRD finished fourth in the NBI after losing the third place playoff series 1–2 against Siófok KC. However, it gave them access to their first European Cup, the 2012–13 Women's EHF Cup. One year later the team won its first medal in the elite after a double victory over Váci NKSE in the third place playoff.

Crest, colours, supporters

Kit manufacturers and Shirt sponsor
The following table shows in detail Érdi VSE kit manufacturers and shirt sponsors by year:

Team

Current squad
Squad for the 2022–23 season

 Head coach: Judit Simics
 Goalkeeper's coach: Szvetlana Gridnyeva
 Fitness coach: Szandra Maurer

 Doctor: János Antal
 Masseur: Zsolt Ladvenszky
 Technical director: Adrienn Blaskovits

Goalkeepers
 1  Gréta Hadfi
 12  Kamilla Kántor
 16  Kyra Csapó
Wingers
RW
 77  Lilla Csáki
 7  Fruzsina Azari
LW
 14  Bozsana Fekete
 24  Fanni Gerencsér
 68  Villő Pécsi
Line players
 2  Sára Paróczy
 44  Réka Sztankovics
 83  Dorottya Zsófia Kiss
Back players
LB
 8  Barbara Kopecz
 19  Dóra Horváth
 4  Klára Csiszár-Szekeres
  Kincső Gerháth
CB
 20  Noémi Ábrahám
 66  Zsófi Csáki
 10  Lilla Puskás

RB

Transfers
Transfers for the 2023–24 season

 Joining

 Leaving
  Gréta Hadfi (GK) (to  Mosonmagyaróvári KC SE)
  Bozsana Fekete (LW) (to  MTK Budapest)
  Sára Paróczy (LP) (to  Dunaújvárosi Kohász KA)
  Zsófi Csáki (LB)

Notable former players

 Kinga Janurik
 Tímea Tóth
 Gabriella Tóth
 Melinda Vincze
 Nadine Schatzl
 Anna Kovács
 Krisztina Triscsuk
 Kinga Klivinyi
 Anett Kisfaludy
 Klára Szekeres
 Laura Szabó
 Nikolett Kiss
 Barbara Bognár
 Viktória Oguntoye
 Mariama Signaté
 Coralie Lassource
 Julie Foggea
 Katarina Krpež-Šlezak
 Jovana Kovačević
 Jelena Lavko
 Sandra Kuridza
 Anđela Bulatović
 Sara Vukčević
 Alexandra do Nascimento
 Larissa Araújo
 Jamina Roberts
 Mireya González
 Alja Koren
 Kristina Elez
 Yulia Khavronina
 Ekaterina Kostiukova
 Markéta Jeřábková
 Réka Bízik

Coaches 

  Edina Szabó (2010–2020)
 Roland Horváth (2020–2023)
 Judit Simics (2023–)

Honours

Domestic competitions
Nemzeti Bajnokság I (National Championship of Hungary) 
 Third place (6): 2012–13, 2013–14, 2014–15, 2015–16, 2016–17, 2017–18

Magyar Kupa (National Cup of Hungary)
 Finalist (2): 2015–16, 2017–18
 Bronze medal (1): 2014–15

Nemzeti Bajnokság I/B:
 Gold: 2010

European competitions
EHF Cup
Semifinalists: 2014–15

Recent seasons

Seasons in Nemzeti Bajnokság I: 11
Seasons in Nemzeti Bajnokság I/B: 2
Seasons in Nemzeti Bajnokság II: 11

In European competition

Participations in Champions League: 1x
Participations in EHF Cup: 6x
Participations in Cup Winners' Cup: 2x

References

External links
 

 
Hungarian handball clubs
Handball clubs established in 1973